Wesley I. Sundquist (born 1959) is an American biochemist. Sundquist is known for studying the cellular, molecular and structural biology of retroviruses, particularly HIV. He is also known for studying the ESCRT pathway in cell division.
Wesley Sundquist was born in St. Paul, Minnesota in 1959. He grew up in St. Paul Minnesota and Washington, DC. He received his bachelor’s degree in Chemistry from Carleton College in Minnesota in 1981. During his time at Carleton Sundquist served as the coordinator of the Faribault Project, was elected to Sigma Xi and received a National Merit Scholarship (1977-81). Sundquist went on to complete a PhD at the Massachusetts Institute of Technology with Stephen J. Lippard in 1988. Following his PhD, he participated in postdoctoral research at the MRC Laboratory of Molecular in Cambridge, England under Sir Aaron Klug. In 1992 Sundquist joined the University of Utah Department of Biochemistry. Sundquist is married to Nola Sundquist, with whom he lives with in Salt Lake City, Utah. They have two adult children, Chris and Emily.

Work and discoveries 

Sundquist is Distinguished Professor and Chair of the Department of Biochemistry at the University of Utah, and he also directs a research lab. The Sundquist Lab focuses on cellular, molecular and structural biology of retroviruses with a focus on Human Immunodeficiency Virus, HIV. Major projects in his lab include, 1) enveloped virus assembly 2) ESCRT pathway functions and regulation in cell division and cancer, and 3) HIV capsid structure, replication and restriction.

Enveloped virus assembly and budding 
To leave a cell and spread infection, HIV viral particles must become enveloped within a membrane and bud from the cell. Sundquist found that retroviruses like HIV bud from infected cells using the host Endosomal Sorting Pathway Required for Transport or ESCRT pathway. HIV also uses the host proteins of the Angiomotin family to facilitate membrane envelopment prior to ESCRT- mediated budding. Sundquist's current research in this area focuses on understanding assembly and budding of HIV, characterizing the host and viral proteins involved, and testing innate immune restriction of viruses that use the ESCRT pathway. The Sundquist lab has also used their understanding of the requirements and principles of enveloped virus assembly to design and characterize new proteins that can assemble into nanocages, bud from cells, and carry cargoes into new target cells.

Selected publications 

 Garrus JE, von Schwedler UK, Pornillos O, Morham SG, Zavitz KH, Wang HE, Wettstein DA, Stray KM, Cöté M, Rich RL, Myszka DG, Sundquist WI. (2001). Tsg101 and the vacuolar protein sorting pathway are essential for HIV-1 budding. Cell, 107, 55-65.

 von Schwedler U, Stuchell M, Müller B, Ward D, Chung H-Y, Morita E, Wang H, Davis T, Gong-Ping H, Cimbora DM, Scott AT, Kräusslich H-G, Kaplan J, Morham SG, and Sundquist WI. (2003). The protein network of HIV budding. Cell, 114, 701-713.

 Mercenne G, Alam SL, Arii J, Lalonde MS, Sundquist WI. (2015). Angiomotin functions in HIV-1 assembly and budding. eLife, 4, e03778. 

 Votteler J, Ogohara C, Yi S, Hsia Y, Natterman U, Belnap DM, King NP, Sundquist WI. (2016). Designed proteins induce the formation of nanocage-containing extracellular vesicles. Nature, 540, 292-5

ESCRT pathway functions and cell division

The ESCRT pathway facilitates formation of vesicles that bud into the endosome, neuronal pruning, reassembly of the post-mitotic nuclear envelope, final stage cell division (cytokinetic abscission). Cytokinetic abscission completes the separation of the two daughter cells, and also helps to coordinate a checkpoint that delays cell division until mitotic processes are completed successfully. In some cancer cells, this regulation doesn’t function correctly. Sundquist’s lab is studying these processes by determining the structures and functions of individual ESCRT proteins and the cofactors they recruit to help mediate abscission and the abscission checkpoint, and the signaling pathways that control their activities.

Selected publications 

 Scott A, Gaspar J, Stuchell-Brereton MD, Alam SL, Skalicky JJ, Sundquist WI. (2005) Structure and ESCRT-III protein interactions of the MIT domain of human VPS4A. PNAS, 102(39), 13813-13818.

 McCullough J, Clippinger AK, Talledge N, Skowyra ML, Saunders MG, Naismith TV, Colf LA, Afonine P, Arthur C, Sundquist WI, Hanson PI, Frost A. (2015) Structure and membrane remodeling activity of ESCRT-III helical polymers. Science, 350(6267), 1541-1551.

 Stuchell-Brereton MD, Skalicky JJ, Kieffer C, Karren MA, Ghaffarian S, Sundquist WI. (2007) ESCRT-III recognition by VPS4 ATPases. Nature, 449, 740-744.

 Morita E, Sandrin V, Chung HY, Morham SG, Gygi SP, Rodesch CK, Sundquist WI. (2007). Human ESCRT and ALIX proteins interact with proteins of the midbody and function in cytokinesis. EMBO J, 26(19), 4215-27.

 Caballe A, Wenzel DM, Agromayor M, Alam SL, Skalicky JJ, Kloc M, Carlton JG, Labrador L, Sundquist WI, Martin-Serrano J (2015). ULK3 regulates cytokinetic abscission by phosphorylating ESCRT-III proteins. eLife, 4, e06547.

HIV replication and restriction

The capsid of HIV facilitates viral reverse transcription and protects the viral genome from the innate immune system. Sundquist defined the fullerene cone structure of the viral capsid, helping to set the stage for development of highly potent and long-lasting capsid inhibitors at Gilead Sciences. The Sundquist lab was also the first to reconstitute HIV reverse transcription and integration in a cell-free system. Sundquist and his collaborators also helped to define how the host restriction factor, TRIM5alpha recognizes and assembles around the capsid.

Selected publications 
 Ganser BK, Li S, Klishko VY, Finch JT, Sundquist WI. (1999). Assembly and analysis of conical models for the HIV-1 core. Science, 283(5398), 80-3. 

 Li S, Hill CP, Sundquist WI, Finch JT. (2000). Image reconstructions of helical assemblies of the HIV-1 CA protein. Nature, 407(6802), 409-13. 

Pornillos O, Ganser-Pornillos BK, Kelly BN, Hua Y, Whitby FG, Stout CD, Sundquist WI, Hill CP, Yeager M. (2009). X-ray structures of the hexameric building block of the HIV capsid. Cell, 137(7), 1282-92.

Li Y-L, Chandrasekaran V, Carter SD, Woodward CL, Christensen DE, Dryden KA, Pornillos O, Yeager M, Ganser-Pornillos BK, Jensen GJ, Sundquist WI (2016). Primate TRIM5 proteins form hexagonal nets on HIV-1 capsids. eLife, 5, e16269.

Christensen DE, Ganser-Pornillos BK, Johnson JS, Pornillos O, Sundquist WI, (2020). Reconstitution and visualization of HIV-1 capsid dependent replication and integration in vitro. Science. 370(6513):eabc8420

Honors and scientific legacy 
In 1993 Sundquist received the Searle Scholars Award.

In 2003 he received the ASBMB Amgen Award for the Application of Biochemistry and Molecular Biology to the understanding of disease.

In 2004 he received both the MERIT award from the National Institutes of Health and the Bernard Fields award for Retrovirology.

In 2017 he received the University of Utah Rosenblatt Prize for Excellence.

He has been elected to the American Academy of Arts and Sciences (2011) and the National Academy of Sciences. (2014).

References

Massachusetts Institute of Technology School of Science alumni
20th-century American chemists
People from Saint Paul, Minnesota
Carleton College alumni
University of Utah faculty
1959 births
Living people
People from Washington, D.C.